The  was held on 7 February 1993 in Kannai Hall, Yokohama, Kanagawa, Japan.

Awards
 Best Film: Sumo Do, Sumo Don't
 Best New Actor:
Etsushi Toyokawa – 12-nin no Yasashii Nihonjin, Kira Kira Hikaru, Kachō Shima Kōsaku
Yoshiyuki Ōmori – Wangan Bad Boy Blue, Seishun Dendekedekedeke, Bokutō Kidan
 Best Actor: Masahiro Motoki – Sumo Do, Sumo Don't
 Best Actress: Yōko Minamino – Kantsubaki, Watashi o Daite Soshite Kisu Shite
 Best New Actress: Yuki Sumida – Bokutō Kidan
 Best Supporting Actor: Hideo Murota – Original Sin
 Best Supporting Actress:
Keiko Oginome – The Triple Cross
Misa Shimizu – Sumo Do, Sumo Don't, Future Memories: Last Christmas, Okoge
 Best Director: Masayuki Suo – Sumo Do, Sumo Don't
 Best New Director:
Katsuya Matsumura – All Night Long
Tadafumi Tomioka – Wangan Bad Boy Blue
 Best Screenplay: Masayuki Suo – Sumo Do, Sumo Don't
 Best Cinematography: Yasushi Sasakibara – Wangan Bad Boy Blue, Original Sin
 Special Prize: Kinji Fukasaku (Career)

Best 10
 Sumo Do, Sumo Don't
 The Triple Cross
 Seishun Dendekedekedeke
 Original Sin
 Kira Kira Hikaru
 Netorare Sōsuke
 The Games Teachers Play
 12-nin no Yasashii Nihonjin
 Wangan Bad Boy Blue
 Arifureta Ai ni Kansuru Chōsa
runner-up. Pineapple Tours

References

Yokohama Film Festival
1993 film festivals
1993 in Japanese cinema
Yoko
February 1993 events in Asia